The San Benito Gravels is a Quaternary Epoch geologic formation in California.

Geology
The Pleistocene Period Lake San Benito and others were formed in the prehistoric Pajaro River-San Benito River basin. The lakes were along  on each side of the San Andreas Fault, the movements of which were responsible for the formation of those lakes.

The Purisima Formation surrounds the San Benito Gravels, and was a primary source of the silt and gravels deposited in them.

The present day San Benito River cuts a channel through the formation.

Fossils
The San Benito Gravels formation preserves Cenozoic Era non−marine fossils.

See also

 List of fossiliferous stratigraphic units in California
 Paleontology in California

References

Pleistocene California
Geology of San Benito County, California
Geologic formations of California